Vinjeåi is a river in Vestfold og Telemark county, Norway. The river flows downstream and end when it joins the river Tokke at the village of Åmot. Vinjeåi was regulated as part of the Tokke hydroelectric power development in the 1960s, and water from Vinjevatn is transferred through tunnel to the Tokke Hydroelectric Power Station.

See also
List of rivers in Norway

References

Vinje
Rivers of Vestfold og Telemark